The Long Beach Area Council (LBAC), headquartered in Long Beach and founded in 1919, is one of five Boy Scouts of America councils in Los Angeles County, California.

Organization
Los Fierros District
Polaris District

Camps
Camp Tahquitz – Located in Angelus Oaks, California 
Long Beach Sea Base

Honor camping societies
The Long Beach Area Council did not have an Order of the Arrow lodge for many years, but used only its camping honor society, the Tribe of Tahquitz. The Tribe of Tahquitz continues today, but on January 15, 2012 the Long Beach Area Council formed an Order of the Arrow lodge. The new Order of the Arrow Lodge held its first Ordeal the weekend of May 18-20 where the new lodge name, Puvunga Lodge 32, and totem, the porpoise, were chosen. The Lodge was named Puvunga because it was an ancient village and burial site thought to have once been populated by the Tongva people, who are the indigenous inhabitants of the region around Los Angeles, California.

See also

Scouting in California
Tahquitz (spirit)

References

Boy Scout councils in California
Organizations based in Long Beach, California
1919 establishments in California